is Japanese former football player and journalist. His brother Taro Kagawa was also footballer.

Playing career
Hiroshi Kagawa was born in Kobe in 1924. After graduating from Kobe University of Commerce, he played for Osaka SC. He and his team won second place at 1952 Emperor's Cup.  His teammates included Taro Kagawa, Taizo Kawamoto, Toshio Iwatani, and others.

Journalist career
Hiroshi Kagawa started a journalist career in 1951. In 1952, he joined Sankei Shimbun. He also served as editor of Sankei Sports from 1974 to 1984. In 1990, he retired and then became a freelance journalist. In 2010, he was selected Japan Football Hall of Fame. He covered ten World Cups. At the 2014 World Cup, he was 89 years old and was the oldest media representative on duty. On January 12, 2015, he was presented with the FIFA Presidential Award at the 2014 FIFA Ballon d'Or by President Sepp Blatter.

References

External links
Japan Football Hall of Fame at Japan Football Association
Kagawa Soccer Library
Japan Soccer Archive

1924 births
Living people
Kobe University alumni
Association football people from Hyōgo Prefecture
Japanese footballers
Association football forwards